Hagaste is a village in Hiiumaa Parish, Hiiu County in northwestern Estonia.

The village is first mentioned in 1620 (Akaste by). Historically, the village was part of Suuremõisa Manor.

Eastern part of the village is known as Sillaotsa, or Süllatse, or Silluste. 1977–1997 the village was part of Värssu village.

References
 

Villages in Hiiu County